Sakaleona is a river in the regions of Amoron'i Mania and Vatovavy in eastern Madagascar. It flows down from the central highlands to flow into the Indian Ocean near Nosy Varika.

See also
Sakaleona Falls

References

Rivers of Amoron'i Mania
Rivers of Vatovavy
Rivers of Madagascar